Anextiomarus (Gaulish: Anextlomāros, 'Great Protection') is a Celtic epithet of the sun-god Apollo recorded in a Romano-British inscription from South Shields, England. A variant form, Anextlomarus, appears as a divine style or name attested in a fragmentary Gallo-Roman dedication from Le Mans, France. Anextlomarus is also attested as a Gaulish man's father's name at Langres, and a feminine divine form, Anextlomara, appears in two other Gallo-Roman dedications from Avenches, Switzerland.

Name 
The Gaulish theonym Anextlomāros means 'Great Protection', that is to say 'he who is in Great Protection'. It stems from the noun anextlo- ('protection'; cf. Old Irish anacul) attached to māros ('great').

References 

Bibliography

External links 
 Romano-British gods
 Avenches museum

Gods of the ancient Britons
Epithets of Apollo